This is a list of swimming pools in Hungary.

List of pools

See also
List of swimming pools in Sweden
 List of diving facilities in Hungary
 List of indoor arenas in Hungary

References

Swimming pools
Hungary